Coastal Carolina University Soccer Field is a soccer-specific stadium in Conway, South Carolina on the Coastal Carolina University campus. The field is home to the Coastal Carolina Chanticleers men's and women's soccer teams. The facility seats 1,000 people.

References

External links 

Stadium

Coastal Carolina Chanticleers sports venues
Soccer venues in South Carolina
College soccer venues in the United States
Sports venues completed in 2003
2003 establishments in South Carolina